Mijušković is a Serbo-Croatian surname. Notable people with the surname include:

Jovanka Kalić-Mijušković (born 1933), Serbian historian
Jovan Mijušković (born 1944), Serbian doctor and politician 
Mile Mijušković (born 1985), Montenegrin handball player 
Nemanja Mijušković (born 1992), Montenegrin footballer
Slavko Mijušković (1912–1989), Yugoslav historian

Montenegrin surnames
Serbian surnames
Slavic-language surnames
Patronymic surnames